Ramesh Kumar is an Indian politician and a member of the Indian National Congress party. He replaced his brother Sajjan Kumar, who convicted and sentenced to a term of life imprisonment for masterminding the 1984 anti-Sikh riots.

References 

People from Delhi
Living people
Indian National Congress politicians
India MPs 2009–2014
Lok Sabha members from Delhi
United Progressive Alliance candidates in the 2014 Indian general election
People from South Delhi district
Year of birth missing (living people)